Richard De Vere (18 June 1967 – 10 March 2014) was a British showman who performed for 21 consecutive seasons at Blackpool Pleasure Beach.

Biography
De Vere was from Bolton, the grandson of Arthur Holt, the Liberal Member of Parliament for Bolton West and President of the Liberal Party. De Vere was an illusionist, magician and showman. He took up magic when at school in Bolton. He told the Blackpool Gazette in 2006: “With a lot of practice it became a skill – making it interesting enough for people to want to watch was as much the skill as performing the trick or illusion.” His showbusiness mentor, the comedian Bernie Winters, bequeathed to him his St Bernard, Schnorbitz.

Career

Mystique (1995–2008)
Master illusionist De Vere took the centre stage headliner for much of the proceedings and featured many illusions and tricks. Various glamorous attendants popped in and out of claustrophobic boxes, bewildering the audience.

Beyond Belief (2008–2013)
De Vere starred in his own show, Beyond Belief, from 2008 until 2013 in the Horseshoe Bar at Blackpool Pleasure Beach.  The show was written and produced by De Vere himself, featuring vocalist Marc Lawlor and dancers, Schnorbitz and iCloud the Cat.

Pantomimes
De Vere played his first panto villain in Liverpool at the Empire in 1989 with American television star Mr T. De Vere was a veteran pantomime villain who made several appearances at Liverpool's Royal Court theatre, along with his trusty St Bernard Schnorbitz. He was also a regular Panto Villain at St. Helens Theatre Royal throughout the 2000's with long time cohort Marc Lawlor.

Death
De Vere died at the age of 46 whilst on holiday in Thailand on 10 March 2014.  He died after contracting pneumonia and suffering a heart attack.

References

1967 births
People from Bolton
English magicians
2014 deaths
20th-century English businesspeople